Elverene Park "Ken" Kendall (6 March 1884 – 27 March 1969) was an Australian rules footballer who played with University in the Victorian Football League (VFL).

Sources
Holmesby, Russell & Main, Jim (2007). The Encyclopedia of AFL Footballers. 7th ed. Melbourne: Bas Publishing.

1884 births
Australian rules footballers from Victoria (Australia)
University Football Club players
People educated at Wesley College (Victoria)
1969 deaths